The Cordelia A. Culbertson House is a historic house located at 1188 Hillcrest Ave. in Pasadena, California. Built in 1911, the house was designed by prominent Pasadena architects Charles and Henry Greene. The Greenes designed the house in the Craftsman style; the design also features Chinese elements throughout, particularly on the south side of the home. Both styles frequently appeared in Greene and Greene's designs, and the house's U-shaped floor plan can also be seen in the brothers' other houses. However, the home features gunite exterior walls and a tile roof, a unique combination among the Greenes' works. An Italian garden is situated at the center of the home. The house was built for Cordelia, Kate, and Margaret Culbertson, three unmarried sisters; Cordelia, the eldest sister, officially commissioned the house. In 1917 the house was purchased by the wealthy widow Mrs. Dudley P. Allen of Cleveland, Ohio. She purchased it as a summer home that she enjoyed with her second husband Francis F. Prentiss, who later died there in 1937.

The house was added to the National Register of Historic Places on September 12, 1985.

References

American Craftsman architecture in California
Houses completed in 1911
Houses in Pasadena, California
Houses on the National Register of Historic Places in California
Buildings and structures on the National Register of Historic Places in Pasadena, California
Greene and Greene buildings